Lophocolea is a genus of liverworts belonging to the family Lophocoleaceae. The genus has a cosmopolitan distribution.

Species
The species of the genus Lophocolea include:
 Lophocolea aberrans Lindenb. & Gottsche 
 Lophocolea aequifolia Nees & Mont.
 Lophocolea bidentata (L.) Dumort.
 Lophocolea heterophylla (Schrad.) Dumort.

References

Jungermanniales
Jungermanniales genera